The Barawa football team is the team representing the Somali diaspora in England. It is named after Barawa, a port town in 
Somalia. It hosted the 2018 ConIFA World Football Cup.

History
The Barawa Football Association was developed in 2015. Using football as a tool, the aim is to highlight Barawanese cultural around the world and actively redevelop football in the southern region of Somalia. Barawa was admitted into ConIFA in June 2016.

In June 2017, at the ConIFA meeting held during the 2017 ConIFA European Football Cup, it was announced that the Barawa Football Association had been selected to act as the host for the 2018 World Football Cup. However, under ConIFA's criteria, the "host" is the ConIFA member that heads the organising committee for the tournament, which does not necessarily mean that it needs to be played in the host's territory. Barawa is located in Somalia, but the Barawa FA represents members of the Somali diaspora in England. The 2018 CONIFA World Football Cup, hosted by the Barawa FA, was held in England.

World Cup record

Fixtures and Results

2016

2018

2019

2021

Squad
The following players were called up to the final 23 man squad for the 2018 ConIFA World Football Cup. Caps and goals up to date as of 4 June 2018 after the game against .

Head Coach:  Abdikarim Farah

Recent callups

Managers

References

External links
Barawa Football Association

CONIFA member associations
African national and official selection-teams not affiliated to FIFA
Barawa football team